Boris Johnson carried out the third significant reshuffle of his majority government (the Second Johnson ministry) from 5 to 8 July 2022, having last done so in September 2021. This was a direct result of the July 2022 United Kingdom government crisis in which more than a third of ministers and parliamentary private secretaries resigned from their positions.

Initial changes were made following the resignations of Rishi Sunak, Chancellor of the Exchequer, and Sajid Javid, Secretary of State for Health and Social Care, within hours of each other on 5 July. Nadhim Zahawi was appointed to replace Sunak and Stephen Barclay to replace Javid. Later changes were announced after it was announced that Johnson would resign as Leader of the Conservative Party, triggering a leadership election. Michelle Donelan resigned two days after being appointed to replace Nadhim Zahawi in his former role as Secretary of State for Education. Michael Gove had been dismissed by Johnson on 6 July due to perceived disloyalty to the Prime Minister. Simon Hart also resigned as Secretary of State for Wales on 6 July and Brandon Lewis resigned as Secretary of State for Northern Ireland on 7 July. Gove, Hart and Lewis were replaced by backbench MPs Greg Clark, Robert Buckland and Shailesh Vara respectively.

The ministry served as a caretaker government until Liz Truss was elected in the Conservative Party leadership election and was sworn in as prime minister.

Cabinet-level changes

Junior ministerial changes

Whips' Office appointments

References

Notes

See also 
 Chris Pincher scandal

Cabinet reshuffles in the United Kingdom
Boris Johnson
2022 in British politics
July 2022 events in the United Kingdom